Summerbridge is a village in Nidderdale in Harrogate district, North Yorkshire, England. The village is part of the historic West Riding of Yorkshire.

The village has one public house, the Flying Dutchman, owned and operated by Samuel Smiths Old Brewery, tea rooms and several other shops (a post office, a general store, a large hardware store). Other businesses include a sawmill and a garage, and there are several more businesses on a small industrial estate at New York, sometimes considered part of Summerbridge. There is also a large Methodist church, a primary school and a retained fire station.

Summerbridge is served by two-hourly buses of Harrogate Bus Company (route 24) between Harrogate and Pateley Bridge.

The village is the largest settlement in the civil parish of Hartwith cum Winsley.

References

External links

Map of Summerbridge

Nidderdale
Villages in North Yorkshire